Warren Street station may refer to:

Warren Street tube station, a London Underground station on the Northern and Victoria lines
Warren Street station (MBTA), a light rail station on the MBTA Green Line B branch in Boston
Warren Street/NJIT station, an underground Newark Light Rail station
Warren Street station (IRT Ninth Avenue Line), a former elevated New York City Subway station

See also
Warren Street
Warren Avenue station, a QLINE light rail station in Detroit, Michigan